Char Monai, also spelt Charmonai, is an administrative union of Barisal District in the division of Barisal in southern-central Bangladesh. It is the headquarters of the Charmonai Darbar Sharif.

Notable people
Syed Fazlul Karim, 2nd Pir of Charmonai
Syed Rezaul Karim, current Pir of Charmonai
Syed Faizul Karim, senior vice-president of Islami Andolan Bangladesh

References

Populated places in Barisal District